Mélanie René (born 1 September 1990) is a Swiss singer and songwriter. She represented Switzerland in the Eurovision Song Contest 2015 with the song "Time to Shine". 

René is of Mauritian origin.

Singles

See also
Switzerland in the Eurovision Song Contest 2015

References

External links

1995 births
Eurovision Song Contest entrants of 2015
Living people
Musicians from Geneva
Eurovision Song Contest entrants for Switzerland
21st-century Swiss women singers
Swiss people of Mauritian descent
Swiss singer-songwriters